Jetsun Dechen Wangmo (c.1925 - 2011) was a Tibetan Buddhist.

Family 
Wangmo was the daughter of a noble family which was said to be descended from the legendary King Gaesar of Ling. She was Minling Khenchen Rinpoche's mother and the aunt of the 11th Mindrolling Trichen Rinpoche, the 11th throne holder of Mindrolling. She was the sister of Jetsun Tsewang Lhamo, and in 1982 they and others left Tibet for Mindrolling monastery in India, a Vajrayana monastery. She died at age 86 in 2011 and was cremated at Mindrolling monastery.

References

Tibetan Buddhists from Tibet
2011 deaths
Year of birth uncertain